The Very Best of Poco may refer to:

 The Very Best of Poco (1975 album)
 The Very Best of Poco (1999 album)